Shashi Kapoor was an Indian actor, film director, film producer and assistant director. He acted in Hindi and English films as the lead hero. He starred in over 175 films. He is the recipient of the Dadasaheb Phalke Award, three National Film Awards, and two Filmfare Awards.

Filmography

As an actor

Producer

 Junoon (1978)
 Kalyug (1980)
 36 Chowringhee Lane (1981)
 Vijeta (1982)
 Utsav (1984)
 Ajooba (1991)

Assistant Director

 Manoranjan (1974) 
 Dulha Dulhan (1964)
 Shriman Satyawadi (1960)
 Guest House (1959)
 Post Box 999 (1958)

Director

 Ajooba (1991)
 Vozvrashcheniye Bagdadskogo Vora (1988) [Russian language]

Awards

Civilian Award

 2011 – Padma Bhushan by the Government of India

National Film Awards

 2015 – Dadasaheb Phalke Award
Winner
 1979 – Best Feature Film in Hindi (as Producer) for Junoon (1978)
 1986 – Best Actor for New Delhi Times (1986)
 1994 – Special Jury Award / Special Mention (Feature Film) for In Custody (1993)

Filmfare Awards
 1976 – Best Supporting Actor for Deewaar (1975)
 2010 – Lifetime Achievement Award

Bengal Film Journalists' Association Awards

Other awards

 2011 – Mohammed Rafi Award
Lifetime Achievement Award
 2009 – The 7th Pune International Film Festival (PIFF)
 2009 – The 11th Mumbai Film Festival (MFF)

References

External links 

Pancham - Rahul Dev Burman

Indian filmographies
Male actor filmographies
Director filmographies